The sixth season of Bulgarian reality singing competition The Voice of Bulgaria premiered on February 24, 2019, and broadcasts at 20:00 every Sunday from Bilnd Auditions to Knockouts and Saturdays during the Live Shows on bTV. Kamelia, Grafa, Ivan Lechev returned for their third season as the coaches of the show and joined by Mihaela Fileva for its first season, replacing Poli Genova.

Atanas Kateliev of team Grafa was announced as the winner for this season. Thus, making it Grafa's first win as a coach of the show.

Coaches 

Kamelia, Grafa and Ivan Lechev are the returning coaches from the previous season. In the released teaser, Mihaela Fileva is the announced new coach of the series replacing Poli Genova, because of her pregnancy.

Teams 

 Color key

Blind Auditions  (Castings in the Dark) 
Each coach has to be filled up with 12 contestants in their respective teams. Continuing from season 4, if the specific contestant rejected by not turning the chairs, the contestant will go out straight from the stage without any conversation by coaches.

Addition in this season, new feature has been added, the "Block" button from the fourteenth season of American version. Each coach will have three new button with the coaches name which they can hit any of those button to prevent the coach on getting the contestant. Also, the coaches will receive only one block for the entire blind auditions.

Color Key

Episode 1 ( February 24, 2019 )

Episode 2 ( March 3, 2019 )

Episode 3 ( March 10, 2019 )

Episode 4 ( March 17, 2019 )

Episode 5 ( March 24, 2019 ) 
During the episode, Ivan Lechev and Grafa performed "Fire" by Grafa.

Episode 6 ( March 31, 2019 )

Episode 7 ( April 7, 2019 ) 
At the end of the Blind Auditions, the coaches performed "Do Posleden Duh"

The Battles (Vocal Fight) 
Battle Rounds took place on April 14, 2019. The Winner of this round will proceed to the next round, which is the Knockouts. Each coaches entitled one "Steal" to steal the losing artist from another team.

Knockouts 
The rules for the Knockouts in this season changed. The seven contestant of each team will fight for the three red chairs to be seated by them instead of grouping them in trio or quartets. After performing the song, the coach will decide either the contestant will straight forward to the next phase by giving chair or will not going by not giving a chair. 

If the coach decided to give a chair to the contestant in specific number even the chairs are filled-in, the last contestant in the last chair, which is the third chair would leave and eliminated and the preceding contestant will shift forward to give way to the contestant on the chair given to him/her. The remaining last-three sitting contestant will move forward to the next round.

Live Shows ( Live Concerts ) 
The Live Shows aired on Saturdays at 20:00 , the Live Shows consist of three phases , Live Concerts, Semi Final and The Finals.

Color key

Week 1

Week 2 ( Semi Finals)

Duel Performances

Week 3 ( Finals / June 9, 2019 ) 
Color key

Round 1

Round 2 
The round 2 of the Finals show will determine the winner of the season.

Elimination Chart

References 

2019 television seasons
Bulgaria
Bulgarian television series
Bulgarian-language television shows